Big Hits is a compilation album released in 1997. As a part of the Hits compilation series, it contains UK hit singles from throughout 1997. The album reached number four in the UK Compilations Chart.

This compilation was released instead of the usual Hits end-of-year compilation for 1997 (with the following year as a prefix, such as Hits 97 from the previous year), meaning that there is no Hits 98 album. Future Big Hits compilations would be released in September, starting from 1998 onwards.

Track listing

Disc one
 Natalie Imbruglia – "Torn"
 Dario G – "Sunchyme"
 Five – "Slam Dunk (Da Funk)"
 M People – "Fantasy Island"
 Gary Barlow – "Open Road"
 Backstreet Boys – "As Long as You Love Me"
 Aaron Carter – "Crush on You"
 Eternal – "I Wanna Be the Only One"
 Robbie Williams – "Old Before I Die"
 No Mercy – "Where Do You Go"
 Louise – "Arms Around the World"
 N-Trance featuring Rod Stewart – "Da Ya Think I'm Sexy?"
 Shola Ama – "Who's Loving My Baby"
 Coolio feat. 40 Thevz – "C U When U Get There"
 Peter Andre – "Lonely"
 Dannii – "Everything I Wanted"
 Ricky Martin – "María"
 Jimmy Ray – "Are You Jimmy Ray?"
 Steven Houghton – "Wind Beneath My Wings"
 Reds United – "Sing Up For the Champions"

Disc two
 Oasis – "Stand By Me"
 Kula Shaker – "Hush"
 Lou Reed – "Perfect Day"
 The Lightning Seeds – "What You Say"
 Propellerheads and David Arnold – "On Her Majesty's Secret Service"
 Tori Amos – "Professional Widow (It's Got to Be Big)"
 Olive – "You're Not Alone"
 Tina Moore – "Never Gonna Let You Go"
 Robert Miles featuring Kathy Sledge – "Freedom"
 Huff & Herb – "Feeling Good"
 Republica – "Ready to Go"
 187 Lockdown – "Gunman"
 The Source featuring Candi Staton – "You Got the Love"
 Faithless – "Don't Leave"
 Finley Quaye – "It's Great When We're Together"
 En Vogue – "Don't Let Go (Love)"
 Enya – "Only If..."
 Paula Cole – "Where Have All the Cowboys Gone?"
 Kylie Minogue – "Did It Again"
 R. Kelly – "I Believe I Can Fly"

External links
 Allmusic entry for Big Hits

1997 compilation albums
Hits (compilation series) albums